Yan Zi and Zheng Jie were the defending champions, but retired due to Zheng's left ankle injury in the second round.

Seeds

* The top four seeds received a bye in the first round.

Draw

Final

Earlier rounds

Top half

Bottom half

External links

Women's Doubles
German Open